The Franklin O-175 (company designation 4AC-176) was an American air-cooled aircraft engine of the 1940s. The engine was of horizontally-opposed four-cylinder and displaced . The power output was nominally . A later variant was designated O-180, despite sharing the same displacement.

A related four-cylinder engine of slightly smaller capacity was known as the O-170 or 4AC-171. It produced .

Variants

O-170
4AC-171

O-175
4AC-176
4AC-176-B  - 65 hp (48 kW) at 2,200 rpm 
4AC-176-BA/(O-175-1)  - 65 hp (48 kW) at 2,300 rpm
4AC-176-C  - 75 hp (56 kW) at 2,500 rpm
4AC-176-D  - 80 hp (60 kW) at 2,650 rpm
4AC-176-F  - 80 hp (60 kW) at 2,500 rpm
4ACG-176

O-180
4AC-176-F3 (O-180-1)

Applications
Aeronca L-3D
Bowyer BW-1 flying wing
CAP-4 Paulistinha
Harris Little Jewel
Interstate Cadet
IPT-7 Junior
Jensen Sport (O-170)
Langley Twin
Piper J-3 Cub
Piper J-4
Piper L-4
Porterfield Collegiate
Taylorcraft BF-60 (O-170)
Taylorcraft BF-65

Specifications (4AC-176-BA2, O-175-1)

See also

References

Notes

Bibliography

 Gunston, Bill. (1986) World Encyclopedia of Aero Engines. Patrick Stephens: Wellingborough. p. 57

Franklin aircraft engines
1940s aircraft piston engines
Boxer engines